is a Japanese footballer currently playing as a midfielder for Iwate Grulla Morioka.

Career statistics

Club
.

Notes

References

1999 births
Living people
Toin University of Yokohama alumni
Japanese footballers
Association football midfielders
J2 League players
J3 League players
Iwate Grulla Morioka players